Moje may refer to:

People
 Dick Moje, American American football player
 Klaus Moje (1936–2016), German-Australian glass artist
 Moje Forbach (1898–1993), German operatic soprano and actress
 Moje Menhardt (born 1934), Austrian painter
 Moje Östberg (1897–1984), Swedish naval officer

Other
 Moje 3, a Serbian girl group
 Moje College Of Education, Nigeria

See also